Yehoram Gaon (born December 28, 1939) is an Israeli singer, actor, director, comedian, producer, TV and radio host, and public figure.  He has also written and edited books on Israeli culture.

The son of Sephardic Jewish parents—a Bosnian father and Turkish mother, both immigrants to Israel— he became an early inspiration of "solidarity and pride" for the Sephardic community.

Early life
Gaon was born in the Beit Hakerem neighborhood of Jerusalem in 1939. His father, Moshe-David Gaon, a historian, was born in Sarajevo, to a family of Sephardic Jewish descent in 1889, and immigrated to then British Mandate of Palestine (now Israel), where members of his family had lived for five generations. He was a school master and Hebrew teacher in Jerusalem, in Buenos Aires, Argentina, and in İzmir, Turkey. Gaon's father was also a poet and a scholar of Ladino. In Turkey, his father met and married his mother Sara Hakim, returning with her to Jerusalem.

Gaon enlisted in the IDF in 1957. In the military, he joined the Nahal entertainment troupe, beginning a career in the performing arts.

Gaon has two children from his marriage to Orna Goldfarb:  Moshe-David (named after his father) and Hila. His three brothers are Yigal, Kalila Armon, and businessman and industrialist Benny Gaon, who died of cancer in 2008.

Music and acting career
After performing in the Nahal Brigade entertainment troupe during his army time, Gaon joined the "Yarkon Bridge Trio".

He was in the original singing group "HaTarnegolim" ("The Roosters"), founded in 1960 by Naomi Polani.

He became well known for his rendition of Naomi Shemer's Od Lo Ahavti Dai (lit. I have not Loved Enough Yet).  He performed at the Nobel Prize ceremony of Yitzhak Rabin, Shimon Peres and Yasser Arafat in Oslo, in 1994. In 2009, Gaon recorded the song "Shir Ha’avoda Vehamlacha" for the organization Pioneers For A Cure, with the proceeds benefiting The Israel Cancer Association (ICA).

Gaon appeared with the Israel Cameri Theatre in productions that included "Chips with Everything", "Vitzek," and  "Kinneret Kinneret," by the National Laureate, Nathan Alterman.  He left Israel in the early 1960s to study acting at the famous Herbert Berghof Studio in New York, under well-known acting teacher Uta Hagen, later graduating with honors from the RCA Institute for TV Production.

He returned to Israel to play the starring role in the 1966 stage production of the original Israeli musical comedy Kazablan, which became an immediate hit, and ran for more than 600 performances.  The musical's huge success made this "young Jerusalem-born singer...not only...an overnight singing star, but also a figure of solidarity and pride for people of Sephardic origin, many of whom were entering a theatre for the first time." Gaon later reprised his role in the 1974 film version.

He was cast as Yonatan Netanyahu in the Israeli film Mivtza Yonatan (1977). He also appeared in Siege, Every Bastard a King, The Eagles Attack at Dawn, Joker, The Lover, and No-Way Street.  He starred in the autobiographical feature, Ani Yerushalmi (lit. I am a Jerusalemite) (1971).

He starred in several other TV series, including Krovim Krovim (1983), an Israeli sitcom. He hosted his own TV show called Shishi BeGaon ("Friday with Gaon") on Israeli Channel One. The show was extremely popular, with a successful run for a number of years.  He later hosted a weekend talk show on commercial Channel 2. Since 1997, he has been hosting a radio show on Reshet Bet called as "Gaon on the radio" (גאון ברדיו), in which he talks about the current weekly events and expresses his personal views on the various current weekly events.

Gaon moderated the Israel Broadcasting Authority documentary series for the Jubilee Year, entitled, T’kuma. In 1998 he resigned from the show, explaining in his letter of resignation that he believed that the series displayed "overly biased pro-Arab views."  "Gaon told the producers of the Channel 1 TV series that he could not tolerate one of the episodes, during which Arab terrorists, responsible for killing many Israelis in the 1970s, were seen to be glorified on the show."

Political and civic career
In 1993 he was elected to the Jerusalem Municipal Council, with the portfolio for Cultural Affairs and Special Education Needs, serving until 2002.  He is the Honorary Consul of Chile in Israel. He also serves as the president of the Arkadash association of the Turkish immigrants in Israel. He also served as a Deputy Mayor of Jerusalem.

He is active in civic affairs, serving as a member of organizations that include the Committee for the Advancement of Ladino, Yad Ben-Zvi Fund for Diaspora Research, Adopt a Soldier Fund, The Association for Soldiers Welfare, The Association for Autistic Children, The Fund for Music Therapy and The Academy For the Hebrew Language.  He is an advocate for peace who has spoken out on some issues, saying it is impossible to freeze growth in settlements, but on the other hand, "I do not approve of angering the entire world. We’re not living alone [on this planet], and we depend on other countries as well.”

Among Gaon's many contributions to Israel's cultural resources include the Moshe David Gaon Center for Ladino Studies at Ben Gurion University, which he and his brother Benny founded in memory of their father.  In December 2010, he donated books to launch the "Sarah Hakim Gaon Library" for Arkadash, in memory of his mother.

Published works

"In The Middle Of The Road" is a book written by Gaon that includes poems, family stories and photos. He edited "Spices from Spain", a collection of Ladino quotes (with Hebrew translations) passed down to him by his father, a well-known historian and proponent of Ladino. He also published a second edition of "Eastern Jews in Israel," an encyclopedic work originally published by his father.
 The complete work includes biographical information on almost 3000 rabbis, scholars and others in Spain, France, Italy, the Ottoman Empire including the Balkans, and the Middle East and North Africa who visited or immigrated to Israel, sometimes moving there to ensure they could die in the Holy Land.
Gaon wrote an autobiography in Hebrew titled Od Ani Pose'ah-Sipur Hayai, published in 2017 by Yedioth Ahronoth.

Awards and recognition

In 2004, Gaon was awarded the Israel Prize, for Hebrew song.
In 2017 Gaon was honored to light Independence Day torch.

See also
 List of Israel Prize recipients

References

External links
 

1939 births
Living people
20th-century Israeli male actors
20th-century Israeli male singers
Deputy Mayors of Jerusalem
Israel Prize in Hebrew song recipients
Israeli male film actors
Israeli male musical theatre actors
Israeli male television actors
Israeli people of Bosnia and Herzegovina-Jewish descent
Israeli people of Turkish-Jewish descent
Male actors from Jerusalem
Israeli male stage actors
Musicians from Jerusalem
Israeli Sephardi Jews
Israeli Mizrahi Jews